, real name , is a former pop idol, actress and voice actress, who gained popularity in the mid-1980s. Her fans often call her Oginome-chan. She is represented by the talent management firm Rising Production.

Career 
Oginome spent most of her elementary and junior high years living in the town of Ranzan in Saitama Prefecture, though she attended school in the city of Sakura. She graduated from Horikoshi High School in Nakano, Tokyo.

While in elementary school, Oginome won a contest and was selected to be part of a three-member group called  under the CBS/Sony label. The group only released two singles and broke up a little over a year after forming. During junior high, Oginome auditioned for a part in Kitty Film's live action movie Shonben Rider, and was subsequently voice cast in their new anime series Miyuki in the role of the heroine, Miyuki Wakamatsu. This led to roles in the anime film Baribari Densetsu and the children's TV series Ugo Ugo Lhuga.

Oginome made her solo singing debut in 1984 with ""Mirai Kōkai (Sailing)" " after finishing up work on Miyuki, though she did not become well known for another year or so after that. During this slow period, her single Beloved Caribbean received wide play as a rooting song at baseball and soccer games for teams such the Seibu Lions, Fukuoka Daiei Hawks, and Cerezo Osaka.

The song that catapulted Oginome into the ranks of superstars was her 1985 release "Dancing Hero (Eat You Up)", a cover of Angie Gold's hi-NRG song "Eat You Up". After that song, almost every song she released was instantly popular, and she began to appear in commercials and on variety shows where her Eurobeat style gained even more exposure. "Dancing Hero" received a boost in popularity in 2017 after an Osaka Prefecture high school's dance club, Tomioka Dance Club (TDC) used it as part of their dance routine that is known as the "Bubble Dance" (named after the dance routine symbolizes the Japan economic bubble era) that went viral after performing it in a competition dressed in eighties attire. She was also host of the Young Studio 101 variety show, a show hosted at various times by other popular idol stars such as Yoko Minamino and Miyoko Yoshimoto.

Her acting career really started in 1986 with starring roles in programs such as the TBS drama , the 1987 TBS series , and the 1989 Fuji TV drama . Oginome also sang the theme songs for these programs.

Oginome has crossed wits with comedian and actor Beat Takeshi on the NTV network variety show Super Jockey, a show known for its crass humor and topics of discussion. She also appeared as a guest performer on the TBS network variety show , starring Takeshi and George Tokoro.

Personal life
Oginome's elder sister is actress Keiko Oginome. On April 30, 1990, film director Yoshitaka Kawai was found dead in Keiko's apartment, having hanged himself after Keiko wanted to end their relationship after five years. Because Keiko was too shocked by the incident, Yōko had to speak to the press on her behalf.

In 2001, Oginome was four months pregnant when she had a shotgun wedding with Ryuso Tsujino, a professional tennis player with whom she had graduated from Horikoshi High School. Oginome had a second child in 2004, and took a year off work to spend time with her children and family. She announced the pending birth of her third child in her blog on March 16, 2006, and the safe delivery on August 10, 2006.

Discography 

Studio albums
 Teens Romance (1984)
 Freesia no Ame (1985)
 Kaigara Terrace (1985)
 Raspberry Wind (1986)
 Non-Stopper: Yōko Oginome "The Beat" Special (1986)
 Route 246 Connexion (1987)
 CD-Rider (1988)
 Verge of Love (1988)
 Verge of Love (Japanese version) (1989)
 Fair Tension (1989)
 Knock on My Door (1990)
 Trust Me (1991)
 Ryūkō Kashu (1992)
 Nudist (1992)
 Scandal (1994)
 Chains  (1997)

Compilation albums
 Yōko Oginome: The Best (1985)
 CD File Vol. 1 (1987)
 CD File Vol. 2 (1987)
 Pop Groover: The Best (1987)
 CD File Vol. 3 (1989)
 '91 Oginome Collection (1990)
 History (1995)
 Yōko Oginome Best Selection (2005)
 Golden Best (2009)

Remix albums
 New Take: Best Collections '92 (1991)
 Best Hits Non Stop Clubmix (1992)

Cover albums
 Voice Nova (2006)
 Songs & Voice (2009)
 Dear Pop Singer (2014)

EPs and Mini-albums
 Heartbeat Express: Sōshun Monogatari Memorial Album (1986)

Collaboration albums
 De-Luxe (1993)

Filmography

Anime 
 Baribari Densetsu - Ai Itō
 Miyuki - Miyuki Wakamatsu

TV series 
 Ugo Ugo Ruga (a TV show for kids) - Planet-chan

Sources:

Kōhaku Uta Gassen appearances

References

External links 

  
 
 Internet Movie Database

 
1968 births
Living people
Japanese idols
Japanese women pop singers
Japanese women singer-songwriters
Japanese singer-songwriters
Japanese voice actresses
People from Kashiwa
Musicians from Chiba Prefecture
Voice actresses from Chiba Prefecture
Ukulele players
Horikoshi High School alumni
English-language singers from Japan
20th-century Japanese women singers
20th-century Japanese singers
21st-century Japanese women singers
21st-century Japanese singers
Victor Entertainment artists